Francisco León may refer to:

 Francisco León, Chiapas, a town and municipality of Chiapas, Mexico
 Francisco León (Mister Venezuela) (born 1981), Venezuelan model and singer
 Francisco Giovanni León (born 1992), Mexican footballer
 Francisco Herrera León (born 1966), Mexican politician
 Francisco León Franco (1832–1880), Vice President of Ecuador
 Francisco León Mane (born 1973), Spanish cyclist

Leon, Francisco